The Sentry Tournament of Champions is the calendar-year opening tournament of golf's PGA Tour season, played in Hawaii on the island of Maui. The tournament was founded in 1953; for most of its history the field was restricted to golfers who won a tournament on the tour during the previous calendar year, but players who qualified for the preceding Tour Championship are now invited as well. From 1986 through 2013, it was the opening event of each tour season; the PGA Tour switched to its wrap-around season (starting season in September and ending in August) in the fall of 2013. In 2022, Cameron Smith shot the lowest 72 hole to-par score in the history of the PGA Tour (−34) to win the tournament.

History
The Sentry Tournament of Champions is held during the first week of January and, since 1999, has been played over the Plantation Course at the Kapalua Resort near Lahaina on the island of Maui in Hawaii. Unlike most PGA Tour events, it is a par 73 course.

Previous venues have been the Desert Inn Country Club in Las Vegas, Nevada, from the event's inception until 1966, and the Stardust Country Club, also in Las Vegas, in 1967 and 1968. For the following thirty years, it was played at La Costa Resort and Spa in Carlsbad, California; it moved from May in 1985 to January in 1986, and relocated to Maui in 1999.

The tournament has had several title sponsors, the first being Mutual of New York (MONY) between 1975 and 1990. After three years of sponsorship by Infiniti, German car maker Mercedes-Benz began a sixteen-year association with the event and the Tournament of Champions name was dropped. In 2010 the tournament entered a new ten-year agreement with Korean broadcasting company Seoul Broadcasting System, with the tournament being renamed as the SBS Championship. Hyundai took over title sponsorship in 2011 with SBS remaining a sponsor. In 2017, SBS became title sponsor again after Hyundai took over title sponsorship of the PGA Tour event at Riviera Country Club. Sentry Insurance signed on as the event's title sponsor with a five-year agreement starting in 2018, later extended through 2030. 

From 2012 to 2015, the tournament used a Friday–Monday format, joining the Deutsche Bank Championship as the only two PGA Tour events with this format. The format allowed the tournament to have its own day to finish, and not compete against the second day of the NFL Wild Card Playoff round.

For the 2021 tournament, the PGA Tour announced that the field would be expanded to include the 30 players qualifying for the 2020 Tour Championship in addition to tournament winners during the 2020 calendar year.  The change was made following the cancellation of ten tournaments due to the COVID-19 pandemic. The 2022 edition reverted to the usual winners-only field, but the addition of Tour Championship qualifiers was made permanent in 2023.

Television
While being played at LaCosta, the weekend rounds were traditionally televised by ABC Sports.  However, after moving to Hawaii in 1999, the time difference was not conducive to network television.  The event moved to ABC's cable partner ESPN for four-round coverage.  In 2007, the event moved to four-round coverage on the Golf Channel. In 2012, NBC Sports began showing weekend play, while also producing the new Monday final round for sister network Golf Channel. Starting in 2018, Thursday-Sunday coverage split between Golf Channel and NBC, with the latter picking up weekend coverage when not in conflict with the network's broadcasts of NFL playoff games.

Winners

Note: Green highlight indicates scoring records.

Multiple winners
Sixteen men have won the tournament more than once through 2023.

5 wins
Jack Nicklaus: 1963, 1964, 1971, 1973, 1977
3 wins
Gene Littler: 1955, 1956, 1957
Arnold Palmer: 1962, 1965, 1966
Tom Watson: 1979, 1980, 1984
Stuart Appleby: 2004, 2005, 2006

2 wins
Frank Beard: 1967, 1970
Don January: 1968, 1976
Gary Player: 1969, 1978
Lanny Wadkins: 1982, 1983
Tom Kite: 1985, 1991
Steve Elkington: 1992, 1995
Phil Mickelson: 1994, 1998
Tiger Woods: 1997, 2000
Geoff Ogilvy: 2009, 2010
Dustin Johnson: 2013, 2018
Justin Thomas: 2017, 2020

Tournament highlights
1953: Al Besselink wins the inaugural Tournament of Champions (TOC) by one shot over Chandler Harper.
1955: Gene Littler is victorious at the TOC for the first time. He wins by 13 shots over Pete Cooper, Jerry Barber, and Bob Toski.
1957: For the third consecutive year, Gene Littler is victorious at the TOC. He finishes three shots ahead of Billy Casper, Jimmy Demaret, Dow Finsterwald, and Billy Maxwell.
1959: Mike Souchak wins by two shots over Art Wall Jr. in spite of his shooting a final round 77.
1960: Jerry Barber shoots 268, a TOC tournament mark for its time in Las Vegas. He beats Jay Hebert by four shots.
1962: Arnold Palmer earns his first TOC title. He birdies the 72nd hole to finish one shot ahead of Billy Casper.
1963: Jack Nicklaus wins the TOC for the first time. He finishes five shots ahead of Tony Lema and Arnold Palmer.
1966: Arnold Palmer successfully defends his TOC title by defeating Gay Brewer 69 to 73 in an 18-hole playoff. For Brewer, it's his second 18-hole playoff loss in a week. In the tournament prior to the TOC, The 1966 Masters Tournament, Brewer was defeated by Jack Nicklaus.
1967: Frank Beard prevents Arnold Palmer from winning a third straight TOC. He holes a seven-foot par putt on the 72nd hole to win by one shot over Palmer.
1969: Gary Player wins in the United States for the first time since his 1965 U.S. Open triumph. He finishes two shots ahead of Lee Trevino.
1972: Bobby Mitchell wins the TOC after he sinks a 20-foot birdie putt on the first hole of a sudden death playoff with Jack Nicklaus
1973: Jack Nicklaus wins the TOC for a fourth time. He beats Lee Trevino by one shot.
1977: Jack Nicklaus collects his fifth and final TOC title. He birdies the third hole of a sudden death playoff to defeat Bruce Lietzke.
1978: Just like the week previous at Masters, Gary Player comes back from seven shots behind to win. He finishes two shots ahead of Andy North and Lee Trevino.
1980: Tom Watson wins by three shots over Jim Colbert. The original margin of victory was five shots but Watson was penalized two shots by tour officials after he was overheard giving advice to his playing partner Lee Trevino.
1981: Lee Trevino earns his first PGA Tour victory in California. He beats Raymond Floyd by two shots.
1982: Ron Streck comes to the 72nd hole tied with Lanny Wadkins but three putts to seemingly lose by one shot. After play is finished, Streck is assessed a two-shot penalty for moving a tree branch in his face on the 70th hole. The penalty drops Streck into a four-way tie for second along with Andy Bean, David Graham, and Craig Stadler and costs him over $14,000 in prize money.
1985: Tom Kite shoots a first round 64 on his way to a six shot triumph over Mark McCumber.
1986: Calvin Peete shoots a new tournament 72 hole scoring record, 267. He finishes six shots ahead of Mark O'Meara.
1991: Tom Kite wins the TOC for a second time when Lanny Wadkins three putts the 71st hole from just eighteen feet.
1995: Steve Elkington birdies the second hole of a sudden death playoff to defeat Bruce Lietzke. During the tournament's final round, third round leader John Huston putted a ball into a lake.
1997: Tiger Woods, who would eventually go on to winning PGA Player of the Year for 1997, birdies the first hole of a sudden death playoff to defeat Tom Lehman.
1999: David Duval wins the first edition of the tournament played in Hawaii. He finishes nine shots ahead of Mark O'Meara and Billy Mayfair.
2000: Tiger Woods wins his fifth consecutive PGA Tour event. He sinks a forty-foot birdie putt on the second hole of a sudden death playoff to beat Ernie Els.
2003: Ernie Els shoots a tournament record 261 on his way to an eight-shot victory over Rocco Mediate and K. J. Choi.
2006: Stuart Appleby defeats Vijay Singh on the first hole of a sudden death playoff. In doing so, Appleby joins Gene Littler as the only golfers to win the tournament three consecutive years.
2010: Geoff Ogilvy successfully defends his tournament title. He finishes one shot ahead of Rory Sabbatini.

Notes

References

External links
Coverage on the PGA Tour's official site

PGA Tour events
Golf in Nevada
Golf in California
Golf in Hawaii
Sports in Maui
Recurring sporting events established in 1953
1953 establishments in Nevada